Oscuro Deseo Producciones is a Mexico City-based company that produces and distributes films. It is directed by César A. Amigó and owned by a board of directors.

Some of its films are the Serial Comic horror film series.

Filmography
Future projects include Serial Comic (2012)
Serial Comic No.2: Mental (2011)
Z: The Definitive Documentary (2011)
Hasta cuando? (2011)
¿Quién anda ahí? (2010)
Lucha Verde: Super Verde vs La contaminación (2010)
Serial Comic No.1: Fijación (2010)
Sesiones (2000)

External links

References

Film production companies of Mexico
Mass media in Mexico City